Tucker Wildlife Sanctuary is a non-profit nature reserve on the Santa Ana Mountains in Orange County, California, in the United States. It is located near the end of Modjeska Canyon, at the foot of Modjeska Peak, and adjacent to the Cleveland National Forest. The Sanctuary is owned and operated by the Environmental Nature Center (ENC). The nearest community is the city of Lake Forest.

The Sanctuary serves as a research center for California State University, Fullerton students, faculty and others. Tucker is open to the public to enjoy and learn about the local wildlife and natural habitat in the Southern California canyon area.

Tucker's facilities include a small natural history museum and interpretive center, two ponds, a bird observation porch and feeders, relaxing patio and picnic areas, a small amphitheatre, a caretaker's house, hiking trails, a gift shop, restrooms and a visitor parking lot.

References

External links

Nature centers in California
Protected areas of Orange County, California
Santa Ana Mountains
Natural history of Orange County, California
California State University, Fullerton